Bevis Longstreth is a retired lawyer and former Commissioner of the United States Securities and Exchange Commission (SEC). He practiced law as a partner at Debevoise & Plimpton, and taught on the faculty of Columbia Law School. His legal scholarship has informed much of the modern understanding of fiduciary duty in the context of institutional investors.

He is also a writer, having authored three historical novels, two set in Ancient Persia and one set in the United States during the 1930s. He sits on the board of a number institutions in education, the arts, and the financial world.

SEC Commissioner

Bevis Longstreth was the 60th Commissioner of the SEC, appointed twice by President Ronald Reagan.  He served from 1981 to 1984. For over two decades, Longstreth was a partner in the New York-based law firm of Debevoise & Plimpton, where he spent all of his career as a lawyer, both before and after servicing as SEC commissioner.

From 1994 to 1999, Longstreth was an adjunct professor at Columbia University School of Law, teaching the regulation of financial institutions.  He has been a frequent speaker and lecturer on various securities and corporate law topics.  He is a former member of the Board of Governors of the American Stock Exchange, a former director of INVESCO, plc, a former trustee of College Retirement Equities Fund and a former director of Grantham, Mayo & Van Otterloo.  For many years he served on the Pension Finance Committee of The World Bank.  , he serves on the board of New School University and is a member of the Council on Foreign Relations. He also serves on the board of The Highlands Current, a not-for-profit newspaper serving the Hudson River Valley.

Author

Bevis Longstreth is a writer of historical novels. He has written three novels: Spindle and Bow (2005), Return of the Shade (2009), and Boats Against the Current (2016). Spindle and Bow is a story of love and adventure set in the 5th Century BC. The story answers many mysteries surrounding the Pazyryk, a perfectly preserved pile carpet measuring about six feet square discovered in 1949 in a royal Scythian tomb with a man, a woman and nine horses cut down in the prime of life. Scholars consider the Pazyryk a masterpiece of weaving technique and artistry dating from the Iron Age, some 400 years before the birth of Christ. It remains today the world's oldest pile carpet. Longstreth is meticulous in his use of facts about the period and the carpet itself, using the accredited available historical sources. The carpet is now on view in the Hermitage Museum in St. Petersburg.

Return of the Shade is the story of Queen Parysatis of Ancient Persia., a Queen and Queen Mother of the Persian Empire at its peak of power.  She lived for about 60 years from around 444 to 384 BC, one and a half millennia ago. She was the purest strain of Persian, a direct descendant of Cyrus the Great, founder of the Achaemenid dynasty and of the Persian Empire, which lasted 220 years from 550 to 330 BC – a dynasty that brought stability, prosperity and a flourishing civilization to what we now call the Middle East and beyond.  In its day, the largest and most powerful Empire the world had ever seen.  It extended from the Indus River to North Africa, from the Aral Sea to the Persian Gulf, all told one million square miles. The Persian Empire had everything under the sun.  Everything, that is, except a single historian to preserve for posterity its highs and lows.  As seen through the eyes Greek historians, the Persians were weak and effeminate: a barbaric and despotic foil against which the courage, discipline, democracy, and culture of the Greek civilization could be set.

Longstreth says of Parysatis, "She was a forgotten Queen in a forgotten Empire, dismissed by the Greeks as hopelessly cruel.  By working with the few facts about her that had been recorded by Greek historians such as Plutarch and Ctesias, it was possible -- much as it would be to divine an entire puzzle from a few important pieces -- to fill in the empty spaces with imagined accounts of Parysatis’ life: a life endowed with great power and the instinct to know how to use it; a life fraught with the drama of the Achaemenids, a royal line beset with patricides, fratricides and other wicked episodes so typical of the ruling classes at all points of the compass. Here, too, was a chance to illuminate an Empire cast in darkness by Greek writers."

Boats Against the Current charts the struggles of six lives braided together in the Great Depression, with FDR's New Deal and its Works Progress Administration serving as armature for the story. These fictional characters blend with many historical figures, including Hallie Flanagan, head of the WPA's famous Theatre Project, Huey Long, the tyrant from Louisiana, and William Allen White, the editor and owner of The Emporia Gazette in Kansas.

Longstreth is also the author of Modern Investment Management and the Prudent Man Rule (Oxford University Press, 1986), a book seeking to modernize the law governing investment management by fiduciaries.

Personal life

Early life 
Longstreth was born in 1934, in New Jersey. He was originally known as Bevis Longstreth, Jr. His parents were Bevis and Mary (Shiras) Longstreth. They had five children:

 Bishop White (from Mary's first marriage)
 Shiras White (from Mary's first marriage)
 Mary Shiras Longstreth 
 Dorothy Longstreth 
 Bevis Longstreth, Jr.

Bevis Longstreth, Sr. was an industrialist, having taken over his mother's family's salt businesses, and upon selling them, starting Thiokol Corporation and leading it until his death in 1944.

Adult life 
A graduate of Princeton University and Harvard Law School (1961, JD), Longstreth served as a First Lieutenant in the US Marine Corps from 1956 to 1958. He married Clara St. John, a musician, in 1963. They have three children. He has run the New York Marathon, and served on the board of Symphony Space.

Son Benjamin Hoyt Longstreth married Molly Elissa Rauch in a Jewish Reform ceremony, in July 2000.

 he had nine grandchildren.

References

Year of birth missing (living people)
Living people
American historical novelists
Writers of historical fiction set in antiquity
Members of the U.S. Securities and Exchange Commission
Columbia University faculty
American male novelists
Novelists from New York (state)
Princeton University alumni
Harvard Law School alumni
Reagan administration personnel